Menachem Mendel of Vitebsk (1730?–1788), also known as Menachem Mendel of Horodok, was an early leader of Hasidic Judaism. Part of the third generation of Hassidic leaders, he was the primary disciple of the Maggid of Mezeritch. From his base in Minsk Menachem Mendel was instrumental in spreading Hasidism throughout Belarus.

In the winter of 1772, he - along with Rabbi Shneur Zalman of Liadi (who regarded Rabbi Menachem Mendel as his Rebbe after the Maggid's passing) - went to the Vilna Gaon with the aim of convincing him to rescind his ban on Hasidism, but the Vilna Gaon would not receive them.

After the Maggid's death, Rabbi Menachem Mendel, along with fellow disciple Rabbi Abraham Kalisker ("Kalisker") settled in Horodok. In 1777 the two, along with 300 followers, emigrated to Eretz Israel, settling in Safed, Ottoman Syria. In 1783 they were forced out of Safed, and moved to Tiberias. The synagogue they built there in 1786 still stands among the Ancient synagogues of Tiberias.

The Tanya (see "Compiler's Preface") is partially based on the works of Rabbi Menachem Mendel.

Menachem Mendel of Vitebsk is the subject of 15 of the stories in Martin Buber's Tales of the Hasidim.

Works
P'ri Ha'Aretz
P'ri Ha'Eitz
Likkutei Amarim

References

External links
 Menachem Mendel of Vitebsk: The Pioneering Rebbe by Rabbi Eliezer Melamed
 KALISKER, ABRAHAM BEN ALEXANDER HA-KOHEN, the Jewish Encyclopedia

1730s births
1788 deaths
People from Vitebsk
Belarusian Hasidic rabbis
Hasidic rabbis in Ottoman Palestine
18th-century rabbis from the Ottoman Empire
Emigrants from the Russian Empire to the Ottoman Empire
18th-century rabbis from the Russian Empire
Hasidic rebbes
Burials at the Old Jewish Cemetery, Tiberias
Students of Dov Ber of Mezeritch